Carl Rabl (2 May 1853 in Wels, Austria – 24 December 1917 in Leipzig, Germany
) was an Austrian anatomist.  His most notable achievement was on the structural consistency of chromosomes during the cell cycle.  In 1885 he published that chromosomes do not lose their identity, even though they are no longer visible through the microscope.

As a student, Rabl's influences included Rudolf Leuckart at Leipzig, Ernst Wilhelm von Brücke at Vienna and Ernst Haeckel at the University of Jena. In 1886, he became a full professor at the German University in Prague (Charles University in Prague), and in 1904 succeeded Wilhelm His as professor of anatomy at the University of Leipzig. He was in charge of the anatomical institute at Leipzig until his death in 1917.

In 1891 he married Marie Virchow, the daughter of German pathologist Rudolf Virchow. In 1902 he was a nominee for the Nobel Prize for Physiology or Medicine — the prize was, however, awarded to Ronald Ross in 1902 for his work involving malaria.

References 

 Edmund B. Wilson.  The Cell in Development and Inheritance.  1911.  2nd ed.  London: Macmillan and Co.  pg 294.
 Carl Rabl: "Über Zelltheilung", Morphologisches Jahrbuch 10, 1885 (in German) 

1853 births
1917 deaths
People from Wels
Austrian anatomists
Academic staff of Leipzig University

Austrian Jews
People educated at Winchester College